Vishka Matir (also Romanized as Vīshkā Mātīr) is a village in Lakan Rural District, in the Central District of Rasht County, Gilan Province, Iran. At the 2006 census, its population was 204, in 55 families.

References 

Populated places in Rasht County